The Chicago Harbor Lighthouse is an automated active lighthouse, and stands at the south end of the northern breakwater protecting the Chicago Harbor, to the east of Navy Pier and the mouth of the Chicago River.

History
The light was constructed in 1893 for the World's Columbian Exposition and moved to its present site in 1919. The United States Lighthouse Board prominently displayed "its 'state of the art' wares and engineering achievements." Prominently featured was "the engineering marvel" of Spectacle Reef Light and a  skeletal cast iron lighthouse tower.

Also displayed at the Exposition were a number of Fresnel lenses, including a stunning Third Order Fresnel lens which was awarded first prize at a Paris glass exhibition. The lens featured alternating red and white panels, and had been ordered for installation in the New Point Loma Lighthouse in California. The coincidental conclusion of construction of the new Chicago Harbor light and the close of the Exhibition prompted the Lighthouse Board to keep the lens in Chicago, and thus the lens was installed in the lantern room of the new tower. The original lens has since been removed, and is now on display at Cabrillo National Monument in California.

Surrounded by rip rap, the structure has several levels: a concrete base and two red roofed buildings with a tapered white cylinder between them which is topped by a parapet and the light itself.

In 1917 the breakwater was renovated. At that time, the lighthouse was moved to its present site, and its attached fog signal room and boathouse were built.

The design is "unique . . . similar to that of the offshore sparkplug towers, but this tower is taller." Except for the additions made at the time of the move, it "bears some resemblance" to the Rock of Ages Light near Isle Royale on Lake Superior, which is its contemporary.

The lighthouse was listed on the National Register of Historic Places on July 19, 1984, and later was designated a Chicago Landmark on April 9, 2003.

In 2005, the light was declared excess by the Coast Guard. It was offered at no cost to eligible entities, including federal, state, and local agencies, non-profit corporations, and educational organizations under the provisions of the National Historic Lighthouse Preservation Act of 2000. After an unusually long delay, United States Secretary of the Interior Kenneth Salazar initiated transfer to the City of Chicago on February 24, 2009. The city had designated the lighthouse a Chicago Landmark on April 9, 2003.

The Lighthouse's "significant role in the development of Chicago" is commemorated in a relief sculpture, entitled The Spirit of the Waters located near the LaSalle Street entrance of Chicago City Hall.

Preservation efforts
"Illinois has two well-known and historic light stations in the Chicago area, plus two pierhead lights." The Chicago Department of Water maintains lights on each of its four water intake cribs.

Chicago has no area lighthouse preservation group, and this light has been the primary beneficiary of attention on preservation attention. However, Illinois and Indiana pierhead lights may need defense against demolition in the future. The Calumet Harbor Light, just across the border in Indiana, was demolished in 1995.

Views of the light
The light is an active aid to navigation, and no access is permitted.

A good view of the lighthouse may be had from Navy Pier, especially at the end of the pier. Better views can be had by boat, including the various tour boats in the area.

References

Further reading

 Andreas, A.T. (1884) History of Chicago from the Earliest Period to the Present Time,
 Chicago's Front Door, Chicago Public Library Digital Collection, website.
 Chicago, Scribner's Monthly (September 1875) Vol. X, No. 5.
 Hyde, Charles K., and Ann and John Mahan. (1995) The Northern Lights: Lighthouses of the Upper Great Lakes.  Detroit: Wayne State University Press.  .
 Havighurst, Walter (1943) The Long Ships Passing: The Story of the Great Lakes, Macmillan Publishers.
 Karamanski, T. Ed., Historic Lighthouses and Navigational Aids of the Illinois Shore of Lake Michigan Loyola University Chicago & Illinois Historic Preservation Agency, (1989).
 Longstreet, Stephen (1973) Chicago 1860-1919 (New York: McKay).
 Lopez, Victor. "This Old Lighthouse: Chicago Harbor Beacon Gets a Facelift." Coast Guard (September, 1997), pp. 24–25.
 Mayer, Harold M. (1957) The Port of Chicago University of Chicago Press.
 
 Rice, Mary J., Chicago: Port to the World (Follet Publishers, 1969).
 Sapulski, Wayne S., (2001) Lighthouses of Lake Michigan: Past and Present (Paperback) (Fowlerville: Wilderness Adventure Books) ; .

External links
 
 
Aerial photos, Chicago Breakwater Light, marinas.com.
Exceptional photograph of Chicago Harbor Light.
Photo of Chicago Harbor light.
Satellite view of Chicago Harbor Light by Google Maps.

Lighthouses completed in 1893
Buildings and structures on the National Register of Historic Places in Chicago
Lighthouses on the National Register of Historic Places in Illinois
National Historic Landmarks in Chicago
Chicago Landmarks
1893 establishments in Illinois